is a Japanese composer who has done a variety of works in video game music, such as in .hack//Legend of the Twilight. He has also arranged a number of music collections for the Suikoden series, including Genso Suikoden IV Music Collection: Another World, some tracks of Genso Suikoden Celtic Collection 2, and all of Genso Suikoden Celtic Collection III. He also composed the soundtrack for the anime Spice and Wolf. Among his other works is the soundtrack for the visual novel Psychedelica of the Ashen Hawk.

External links
 
 

Year of birth missing (living people)
Anime composers
Japanese composers
Japanese film score composers
Japanese male composers
Japanese male film score composers
Living people
Musicians from Tokyo
Video game composers